Wola Grzymalina  is a settlement in the administrative district of Gmina Kleszczów, within Bełchatów County, Łódź Voivodeship, in central Poland.
In the 1980s Wola Grzymalina was destroyed and the area the village was on is a part of Bełchatów Coal Mine.

References

Wola Grzymalina